The Chimariko (Chimariko language: cʼʸˈimar, tʼʸimar, čimar, čʼimar or ǯimar - ″person / Indian″) are an indigenous people of California, who originally lived in a narrow, 20-mile section of canyon on the Trinity River in Trinity County in northwestern California.

History
Originally hunter-gatherers, the Chimariko are possibly the earliest residents of their region. They had good relations with the Wintu people and were enemies of the Hupa, a Southern Athabaskan people.

Non-native fur trappers first entered the Chimariko's territory in 1820, followed by miners and settlers in the 1850s. The Chimariko were profoundly affected by the destructive environmental practices of gold seekers during the California Gold Rush, starting in 1848. One of the major issues involved the disruption of the salmon population that was the main food source of the Chimariko. In the 1860s, conflict between the Chimariko and white miners led to the near extinction of their population. The surviving Chimariko fled to live with the Hoopa Valley Hupa, and nearby Tsnungwe (South Fork or New River Hupa) (also called: Tlohomtah’hoi) and Tlohomtah’hoi (New River or Salmon River Shasta).

Language
Chimariko people spoke the Chimariko language, a Northern Hokan language. The language is currently extinct.
The language probably became extinct sometime in the 1930s. It is extensively documented in unpublished fieldnotes which John Peabody Harrington obtained from the last speaker, Sally Noble, in the 1920s.

Population

Estimates for the pre-contact populations of most native groups in California have varied substantially. Alfred L. Kroeber proposed that the 1770 population of the Chimariko, together with the New River, Konomihu, and Okwanuchu groups of the Shasta, had been about 1,000. Specifically for the Chimariko, he estimated an 1849 population of 250. Shirley Silver (1978:205) put the aboriginal population at "only a few hundred". Other estimates are that there were 250 Chimariko people in the 18th and early 19th centuries, moving down to 200 in 1852, 20 in 1880, and none by 1900. There may have been descendants of the Chimariko recently discovering their identity, since some Chimariko fled with the Hupa and Shasta. In the 2010 census, 60 people claimed Chimariko ancestry, 19 of them full-blooded.

See also
 Chimariko traditional narratives

References

Sources
 Chimariko Bibliography, from California Indian Library Collections Project

External links
 Native Tribes, Groups, Language Families and Dialects of California in 1770 (after Kroeber)

Native American tribes in California
Native Americans in Trinity County, California
California Gold Rush
Extinct ethnic groups